Beno Axionov (Beno Maksovich Aksyonov, ; born 2 April 1946) is a Russian-Moldovan actor, director, drama teacher, screenwriter. Meritorious Artist of  Moldova (1991). Laureate of national and international theater festivals.

Biography

Axionov was born in Minsk, to father Max Shakhnovich Fishman and mother Lidia Aksyonova. At age 5 he moved to Kishinyov, now Chișinău, the capital of Moldova. He studied at the Moldova State Institute of Arts and the Leningrad University of Theater, Music and Cinematography.

From 1969 to 1973 he worked as an actor and director in Tiraspol. From 1971 to 1985 he was a drama teacher at the Moldovan State Institute of Arts. During this time he continued acting and presenting on television. He has starred in 19 films and more than 140 stage roles, and directored more than 50 performances.
 
In 1991, he was awarded with the title Honored Artist of the Republic of Moldova.

Since 2007 he has lived in Karlsruhe, Germany.

References

External links
 

1946 births
Living people
Soviet male film actors
Actors from Minsk
Russian male film actors
Russian male stage actors
Russian male television actors
Honored artists of the Republic of Moldova
Moldovan male film actors
Moldovan male stage actors
Moldovan male television actors
20th-century Russian male actors
Film people from Minsk